Charles Louis François André (March 14, 1842 – June 6, 1912) was a French astronomer, founder of the Lyon observatory which he directed from 1878 until his death.

Charles André was born in Chauny to the watchmaker Louis Alexandre François André and Pacidie Godet. He studied at the private Catholic institution Saint-Charles and joined the École normale supérieure in 1861 and graduated in physics in 1864 after which he taught at the  Lycée de Nevers. He joined the Paris Observatory in 1865 under Urbain Le Verrier and went on an expedition to Nouméa in 1874 to observe the transit of Venus. He obtained imprecise results and identified the source of the error to the instruments, the study of which was his doctoral thesis of 1876.

After strained relations with Le Verrier he sought the creation of an observatory in Lyon and briefly worked at the Faculty of Science in Lyon as a professor of astronomy. He made a visit to Utah in 1878 to observe a transit of Mercury but snow prevented the study. He however visited several American observatories. In 1897 he became the director of the Lyon observatory. In 1892 he studied atmospheric electricity with a balloon ascent. He died at the observatory at the age of 70.

References 

19th-century French astronomers
1842 births
1912 deaths
20th-century French astronomers
Scientists from Lyon